Autonomies for Europe (ApE) was a regionalist coalition of parties formed in Aosta Valley, Italy in order to participate in the 2019 European Parliament election.

The coalition had a technical agreement with the Democratic Party (PD). ApE's candidate was Marco Gheller, who received also the support of Great North, Pro Lombardy Independence and other minor regional parties of northern Italy.

Composition
The alliance is composed of the following five parties:

Originally, For Our Valley was supposed to join ApE, but finally backtracted. Also Mouv', an emerging regional party which would grow bigger in the 2020 regional election, refused to join the coalition.

Electoral results

European Parliament

References

Defunct political party alliances in Italy
Political parties established in 2019
Political parties in Aosta Valley
2019 establishments in Italy
Political parties of minorities